Story of My Life is a novel published in 1988 by American author Jay McInerney.

Plot and characters

The novel is narrated in the first-person from the point of view of Alison Poole, "an ostensibly jaded, cocaine-addled, sexually voracious 20-year-old." Alison is originally from Virginia and lives in Manhattan, where she is involved in several sexual relationships and is aspiring to become an actress. She falls in love with bond trader and Shakespeare expert Dean, but soon they betray each other. The novel implies that the cause of Poole's "party girl" behavior is her father's abuse, including the killing of her prize jumping horse.

Influences
Poole is based on McInerney's former girlfriend Rielle Hunter, then named Lisa Druck. In the novel, Poole describes her childhood and tells how her show jumper horse Dangerous Dan had suddenly "dropped dead."  McInerney's novel ends with Poole disclosing that her horse was poisoned by her father: 

There was speculation that Story of My Life was a roman à clef when it first appeared; to New York Magazines questions "Is it real? Did it happen?" McInerney replied, "I'm anticipating some of that kind of speculation, but I'm utterly confident of not having any lawsuits on my hands. The book is a fully imagined work of fiction. On the other hand, it's not to say that I didn't make use of [pause]...That's why I live in New York. Mine is not an autonomous imagination."

Poole also appears in the novels of Bret Easton Ellis, including American Psycho, in which she is sexually assaulted by the protagonist Patrick Bateman, and plays a major role in Glamorama as the girlfriend of protagonist Victor Ward. A reference to Poole and the Kentucky Derby — a chapter in McInerney's novel — is also included in Mary Harron's film adaptation of American Psycho in a conversation between Bateman (played by Christian Bale), Elizabeth (played by screenplay co-writer Guinevere Turner), and Christie (played by Cara Seymour):

In 2008, McInerney incorporated Hunter's affair with presidential candidate John Edwards into "Penelope on the Pond", featuring Poole, in his short story collections The Last Bachelor and How It Ended.

Critical response

Michiko Kakutani wrote,

Publishing history

In August 2008, Vintage Books ordered an additional 2,500 copies of the book in the wake of the interest generated by then-presidential candidate John Edwards acknowledging his affair with Hunter.

Notes

External links
 Grove/Atlantic, Inc.

1988 American novels
Novels by Jay McInerney
Roman à clef novels
Novels set in New York City
Novels about actors
Atlantic Monthly Press books